St. Anthony's Rock is a geological limestone sea stack and tourist attraction located in the central part of the city of St. Ignace, Michigan in Michigan's Upper Peninsula.

Description
St. Anthony's Rock is a now-landlocked sea stack or sea chimney, geologically similar to several features on  Mackinac Island, such as Arch Rock or Sugar Loaf.  As with nearby Castle Rock, a large chunk of Mackinac breccia resisted the Wisconsinan Glaciation, as well as the erosional forces of the subsequent post-glacial Lake Algonquin.  The post-Ice Age meltoff caused the waters of Lake Algonquin to be much higher than the water level of Lake Huron is today, eroding and washing away the softer rock around the stack.

A local story claims that the rock was named by visitor (1679) Father Louis Hennepin, the chaplain priest of the explorer La Salle.  La Salle and Hennepin carried out a program of public devotions to the Roman Catholic saint Anthony of Padua, and Hennepin is known to have named Saint Anthony Falls after the same saint in 1680.

With the coming of rails to St. Ignace in 1881, a railroad train right-of-way snaked directly adjacent to the unusual rock formation.  St. Anthony's Rock became a tourist attraction celebrated in postcards and photographs.  After a period of neglect the rock was re-celebrated in the 2010s as the site of a small, free-access public park.  A small fence protected the rock from vandals, and a sign described its unusual geology and history.

See also
 Castle Rock
 Rabbit's Back
 Straits of Mackinac

References

Geology of Michigan
Landforms of Mackinac County, Michigan
Roadside attractions in Michigan
Stacks of the United States
Tourist attractions in Mackinac County, Michigan